Past Hits and Previews is the first greatest hits album by Australian rock musician Richard Clapton. The album was released in December 1978 and peaked at number 42 on the Kent Music Report Albums Chart.

The album includes tracks from all four of Clapton's studio albums to date, as well as "Capricorn Dancer" from Highway One soundtrack and two new tracks recorded in 1978, "Steppin' Across the Line" and "When the Heat's Off" during the Hearts on the Nightline recording session.

Track listing

Charts

Release history

References 

Richard Clapton albums
1978 compilation albums
Compilation albums by Australian artists
Infinity Records albums
Festival Records compilation albums
Albums produced by Richard Batchens